Thomas Liddle Farm Complex is a historic home and farm complex located at Duanesburg in Schenectady County, New York. The farmhouse was built about 1850 and is a 2-story, three-bay clapboard-sided frame building in a vernacular Greek Revival style. It has a gable roof, prominent cornice returns, a wide frieze, and broad, fluted corner pilasters.  The -story rear wing dates to the late 18th century. Also on the property are a contributing barn and a tenant house.

The property was covered in a 1984 study of Duanesburg historical resources.
It was listed on the National Register of Historic Places in 1984.

References

Houses on the National Register of Historic Places in New York (state)
Houses in Schenectady County, New York
Greek Revival houses in New York (state)
Houses completed in 1850
National Register of Historic Places in Schenectady County, New York
Farms on the National Register of Historic Places in New York (state)